Mohamed Ehab Mohamed Zahab Khalil is an Egyptian Greco-Roman wrestler. He is a silver medalist at the African Games and a three-time medalist, including gold, at the African Wrestling Championships.

In 2019, he represented Egypt at the African Games held in Rabat, Morocco and he won the silver medal in the men's 77 kg event.

He won the gold medal in his event at the 2022 African Wrestling Championships held in El Jadida, Morocco.

Major results

References

External links 
 

Living people
Year of birth missing (living people)
Place of birth missing (living people)
Egyptian male sport wrestlers
African Games silver medalists for Egypt
African Games medalists in wrestling
Competitors at the 2019 African Games
African Wrestling Championships medalists
21st-century Egyptian people